Eurysternum is an extinct genus of thalassochelydian turtle. Its type species is Eurysternum wagleri, the holotype of which has since been lost and only survives in illustrations.

Formerly assigned species
Eurysternum ignoratum Bram, 1965 is a junior synonym of Thalassemys hughii. The Late Jurassic species Eurysternum neuquinum Fernandez and de la Fuente, 1988, described from marine deposits in Argentina, is now placed in its own genus Neusticemys.

References

Thalassochelydia
Prehistoric turtle genera
Kimmeridgian genera
Late Jurassic turtles
Late Jurassic reptiles of Europe
Jurassic Germany
Fossils of Germany
Fossil taxa described in 1839
Taxa named by Christian Erich Hermann von Meyer